Fincath mac Garrchu (or Findchad mac Garrchon) (died 485) was a king of Leinster. He was a member of the Dál Messin Corb dynasty's principal sub-sept, the Uí Garrchon. He was the son of the founder of this sept Garrchú mac Fothaid.

Not mentioned as king in the Book of Leinster, he is however given this title in the Annals of Innisfallen. He was defeated and killed in the first Battle of Grainaret in 485 by the Uí Néill. The victor of this battle is variously given as Coirpre mac Néill or Muirchertach mac Ercae. Coipre mac Neill was probably the victor and it may record the conquest of north Tethbae and that it was fought near Granard (County Longford)
 
He was succeeded by his son, Fráech mac Finchada (died 495).

Notes

See also
Kings of Leinster

References
 Annals of Ulster at CELT: Corpus of Electronic Texts at University College Cork
 Annals of Innisfallen at CELT: Corpus of Electronic Texts at University College Cork
 Charles-Edwards, T. M. (2000), Early Christian Ireland, Cambridge: Cambridge University Press, 
 Byrne, Francis John (2001), Irish Kings and High-Kings, Dublin: Four Courts Press, 
 Ireland, 400-800, pp. 188, by Dáibhí Ó Cróinín A New History of Ireland, Vol. I,  (edited Ó Cróinín).

External links
CELT: Corpus of Electronic Texts at University College Cork includes: Gein Branduib (original & translation), Annals of Ulster, Annals of Tigernach, Annals of Innisfallen and others.

5th-century births
485 deaths
Kings of Leinster
People from County Kildare
5th-century Irish monarchs
Dál Messin Corb